Constant "Stan" Tourné (30 December 1955) is a retired Belgian cyclist. After winning the world title in points race in 1977 as amateur he turned professional and won the same title again in 1980. He also won two medals at the UCI Motor-paced World Championships in 1984 and 1986. In 1988, he finished in second place but was disqualified for failing the drug test.

As a road cyclist he took part in 176 six-day races. He won seven of them, in Antwerp (1983, 1988 and 1992), Paris (1985), Ghent (1985, 1989) and Cologne (1988), and 21 times finished in second place.

He is married to Ingrid Leleu (b. 1957). Their eldest daughter, Romy Tourné (b. 1980), is married to a Congolese-Belgian man and has a daughter Nina Tshikoyo.

References

1955 births
Living people
Belgian male cyclists
People from Willebroek
UCI Track Cycling World Champions (men)
Cyclists from Antwerp Province
Belgian track cyclists
20th-century Belgian people